The Dungarvon Whooper (pronounced "hooper") is a ghost story, immortalized in a song by Michael Whelan, about the alleged murder along the Dungarvon River in central New Brunswick, Canada, in the late 19th century.

The story revolves around a young Irish cook, often referred to by the name Ryan. Ryan moves to a lumber camp located somewhere along, or very near to, the Dungarvon River, bringing all of his possessions with him, including a money belt. While the lumberjacks are out, Ryan is left alone with the boss of the camp, who decides to murder and rob the young cook. When the crew returns, the boss explains that the cook had taken sick and died suddenly.  They then bury the body in the forest some distance from the camp.  However, a terrible "whooping" sound keeps the group from falling asleep that night, presumably the ghost of Ryan crying out against the crime of which he was the victim. Scared, the men flee the camp the next morning.

The story, which was handed down to lumberers working in New Brunswick throughout the 20th century, is well known in local culture. It was taken seriously enough by the turn of the century that Rev. Edward Murdoch, a Roman Catholic priest from Renous, performed an exorcism at the professed gravesite at Whooper Spring.

There is a chainsaw carving of Ryan at the Municipal Park in Blackville, New Brunswick, Canada

Whelan's "Dungarvon Whooper" song

While the exact origin of the story is unknown, the best-known version comes from a song published in a local newspaper by Michael Whelan in 1912. The song is set to the tune of Where the Silvery Colorado Wends Its Way, by J. Aldrich Libbey.

Far within the forest scene,
Where the trees forever green,
Form a contrast to the beech and birches grey,
Where the snow lies white and deep,
And the song birds seem to sleep,
And cease their sweetest singing all the day.
Where the mighty monstrous moose,
Of limbs both large and loose,
Through the forest sweeps with strides both swift and strong,
Where the caribou and deer
Swim the brooks so crystal clear,
And the mighty deep Dungarvon rolls along.

Where the black bear has his den,
Far beyond the haunts of men,
And the muskrat, mink and marten swim the stream,
Where the squirrel so light and free,
Swiftly springs from tree to tree,
And the lovely snow-white rabbit sleep and dreams;
Where the sounds of toil resound
Far across the frozen ground,
And the thousand things that to the woods belong,
Where the saws and axes ring,
And the woodsmen wildly sing,
And the dark and deep Dungarvon sweeps along.

In a lumber camp one day,
While the crew were faraway,
And no one there but cook and boss alone,
A sad tragedy took place,
And death won another race,
For the young cook swiftly passed to the unknown;
From the day of long ago,
Comes this weary tale of woe,
The sad and solemn subject of my song,
When this young man drooped and died,
In his youth and manhood's pride,
Where the dark and deep Dungarvon sweeps along.

When the crew returned that night,
What a sad scene met their sight,
There lay the young cook silent, cold and dead,
Death was in his curling hair,
In his young face pale and fair,
While his knapsack formed a pillow for his head.
From the belt about his waist
All his money was misplaced,
Which made the men suspect some serious wrong,
Was it murder cold and dread,
That befell the fair young dead
Where the dark and deep Dungarvon rolls along?

When they asked the skipper why
He had made no wild outcry,
He turned away and hid his haughty head;
"Well, the youngster took so sick,
And he died so mighty quick,
I hadn't time to think," was all he said;
A tear was in each eye,
Each heart it heaved a sigh,
While through each breast the strangest feeling throng;
When each reverent head was bared,
As his funeral they prepared,
Where the mighty deep Dungarvon rolls along.

Fast fell the driven snow,
While the wild winds they did blow,
Till four feet deep upon the ground it lay,
So that on the burial day
To the graveyard far away
To bear the corpse impossible was found.
Then a forest grave was made,
And in it the cook was laid
While the song birds and the woodsmen ceased their song;
When the last farewells were said
O'er the young and lonely dead
Where the dark and deep Dungarvon sweeps along.

When the crew returned at night
Their dear comrade still they mourned,
While the shades o'night were falling o'er the hill,
All that long and fearful night
All the camp was in affright,
Such fearful whoops and yells the forest fill;
Pale and ghastly was each face,
"We shall leave this fearful place,
For this camp unto the demons does belong,
Ere the dawning of the day
We will hasten far away
From where the dark Dungarvon rolls along."

Since that day, so goes the word,
Fearful sounds have long been heard,
Far round the scene where lies the woodsman's grave,
Whoops the stoutest hearts to thrill,
Yells that warmest blood to chill,
Sends terror to the bravest of the brave;
Till beside the grave did stand,
God's good man with lifted hand,
And prayed that He those sounds should not perlong
That those fearful sounds should cease,
And the region rest in peace
Where the dark and deep Dungarvon sweeps along.

Since that day the sounds have ceased
And the region is released
From those most unearthly whoops an screams and yells,
All around the Whooper's spring
There is heard no evil thing,
And round the Whooper's grave sweet silence dwells
Be this story false or true,
I have told it unto you,
As I heard it from the folklore all life long,
So I hope all strife will cease,
And our people dwell in peace,
Where the dark and deep Dungarvon sweeps along.

Passenger Train
The nickname "Dungarvon Whooper" was later given to a numbered passenger train operated by the Canada Eastern Railway running from Newcastle to Fredericton, along the Southwest Miramichi River. It has been said that the sound of the steam locomotive whistle reminded local residents of the legend. This train operated on a line originally built by New Brunswick businessmen, Alexander Gibson and Jabez Bunting Snowball. The railway and its passenger service were absorbed into the Canadian National Railway system and the passenger train ceased operation in the early 1960s.

Adaptations
Bernard Colepaugh of Renous produced a play about the "Dungarvon Whooper". It was the first ever production of the Heritage Players, a group dedicated to performing plays based on New Brunswick's rich heritage. Mr. Colepaugh is a descendant of Michael Whalen.

The play starts off in a 1920s school house where teacher Michael Whalen (Bernard Colepaugh) summons his students to class and then excites them with the idea of studying outside under "God's Beautiful Blue Sky". After some smart remarks by Billy Phader (Thomas Saulnier), the older boy in the class, the four students convince their teacher to take a break from the British History work and tell them a ghost story. Susan (Katie McCabe) tells Mr. Whalen to tell about the Dungarvan Whooper. Michael Whalen begins by going back in time to Ireland. The scene then changes to many years before as Peter Ryan (played by student actor Tom Daley) in Ireland just as he is about to leave for the New Country to work, as his mother, family, and friends die of starvation from the Great Famine. He is given his father's money belt and some Prayer Beads, just before he kisses his mother goodbye. Another scene change leaves us in the camp, where Peter Ryan was hired to work as the cook. Jack Hogan (also played by Bernard Colepaugh) walks in with the crew, and they sit down for dinner. Just as they sit down at the table, a Mr. Henry Kelly knocks on the door. He is invited in, and they eat their meal.

Because Henry Kelly is "the best Fiddler in the Country," the crew convinces the boss to let them "treat today like a Saturday" and let them have a party and drink the liquor Ryan bought at the store in Blackville. Ryan has a bit too much to drink, gets carried away in his Irish dancing, and steps on McPherson's foot. Twice. A fight breaks out, and it takes the whole camp to calm Ryan and McPherson down. After a lullaby by Mr. Kelly, the men go to bed, and one of the characters, possibly McPherson, walks in covered under a jacket and puts something in Ryan's personal teapot. In most productions, this is where the intermission would begin, and in many cases, a meal be served to the guests by the cast. Turkey was the most common meal. The play then resumes when the crew are just getting out of bed. McGregor complains of symptoms of a hangover, but the boss tells them to go to work anyway. Hogan requests pies for when they get back. Peter Ryan sits down at the table to enjoy his tea, then suddenly collapses on the floor. Boss picks him up, puts him on the bed, and then the crew comes in, as there is too much snow to work. they find Pete Ryan on the floor dead, and accuse each other for his death. After much bickering and arguing, they decide that it is not right to sleep with a dead body in the camp, so they take him out to the spring and bury him. Upon their return, Whoops and Howls leave and unsettling atmosphere. The Lord's Prayer is recited, and they get to sleep. The grave is later blessed by a priest, and all remains calm deep in the Dungarvon Woods.

External links
Mysteries of Canada: Dungarvon Whooper
MyNewBrunswick.ca: Dungarvon Whooper

References 

Canadian National Railway passenger trains
Named passenger trains of Canada
Canadian folklore
Canadian ghosts
Canadian legends
Culture of New Brunswick
Northumberland County, New Brunswick